Jåttå Upper Secondary School is an upper secondary school in Jåtten, Stavanger, Norway, with 1000 pupils. It was opened for the 2007-08 semester. It is the only school in Rogaland with a "built-in" train station; the train station Jåttåvågen is located just outside the schoolyard of the school.

External links
Official Site

References

Education in Rogaland
Secondary schools in Norway
Rogaland County Municipality
Educational institutions established in 2007
2007 establishments in Norway